União Desportiva Oliveirense (UDO), commonly known as Oliveirense, is a Portuguese sports club from the city of Oliveira de Azeméis, in Aveiro District. The club was founded on 25 October 1922. The main football team currently plays at the Estádio Carlos Osório which holds a seating capacity of 4,000 and plays in Liga Portugal 2. As a multisports club it fields very successful teams in  rink hockey and basketball as well. Its rink hockey team has won the Taça de Portugal on three occasions whilst its basketball team has won the Portuguese Basketball SuperCup and the Portuguese Basketball Cup. The Kelly–Simoldes–UDO cycling team, which holds a UCI Continental team licence, is affiliated with União Desportiva Oliveirense.

Oliveirense is part of the Aveiro Football Association which is the football association in charge of the district's football matters. In its entire history the club has won seven major trophies, of which their first was the AF Aveiro Championship in the 1945–46 season. Oliveirense are currently sponsored by Italian sportswear manufacturer Macron.

The club is owned by Japanese restaurant operator Onodera Group, which is also the owner of Yokohama FC.

History
The club was founded on 25 October 1922 as União Desportiva Oliveirense. Prior to its inception it was called Sport Clube Oliveirense who had begun playing in the district league of Aveiro.

Following its establishment, shortly after Oliveirense was one of the founding clubs of the Aveiro Football Association along with Anadia, Beira-Mar, Bustelo, Clube dos Galitos, Espinho, Fogueirese, Ovarense, Paços Brandão, Sanjoanense, SC Oliveirense and Sociedade Recreio Artístico. The association was founded on the 22 September 1924.

This association would go on to establish the AF Aveiro Championship which Oliveirense would go on to win once in the 1945–46 season. During the 1945–46 season, the club also played in the Primeira Liga where after one season they were relegated. This is their only presence in the Primeira Liga. Following the club's relegation they would go on to play in the AF Aveiro First Division which the club won in the 1951–52, 1956–57 and 1957–58 seasons.

Over the next couple of decades the club would play in the district leagues, Terceira Divisão and Segunda Divisão. From 1989–90 to 2000–01 they played in the second division before gaining promotion to the Segunda Liga before being relegated once again to the second division in which they would six seasons before being promoted to the Segunda Liga in the 2007–08 season. Ever since the 2008–09 they have played in the Segunda Liga and achieved the club's best ever cup run in their history in the 2011–12 season where they reached the semi-final stage before being knocked out by eventually winners Académica de Coimbra.

On 4 November 2022, Yokohama FC announced that the Onodera Group, which owns the club has acquired a majority stake in UD Oliveirense of Liga Portugal 2.  Along with Yokohama FC, it became a subsidiary of the group. Onodera Group became the first company in history to manage J. League clubs and European clubs.

Current squad

Out on loan

Honours

Segunda Divisão (Third-tier): 2
2000–01, 2007–08

Terceira Divisão (Third-tier): 1
1957–58

AF Aveiro Championship: 1
1945–46

AF Aveiro First Division: 3
1951–52, 1956–57, 1957–58

Managerial history

 Vieira Nunes (1991–1992)
 Flávio das Neves (2000–2002)
 Hugo Silva (2002)
 Flávio das Neves (2002–2003)
 Carlos Miragaia (2003–2004)
 Adelino Teixeira (2004–2005)
 Pedro Miguel (2005–2012)
 João de Deus (2012 – 2013)
 Fábio Pereira (3 July 2021 – present)

League and cup history

See also
U.D. Oliveirense (basketball)
U.D. Oliveirense (roller hockey)

References

External links
 Official Site 
 Club Profile at ForaDeJogo 
 Club Profile at LPFP 
 Club Profile at NationalFootballTeams
 Club Profile at Zerozero

 
Football clubs in Portugal
Association football clubs established in 1922
1922 establishments in Portugal
Primeira Liga clubs
Liga Portugal 2 clubs